Brad Crawford (born February 4, 1987) is a former professional Canadian football defensive back. He was drafted by the Toronto Argonauts in the sixth round of the 2009 CFL Draft. He played CIS football for the Guelph Gryphons.

He is the younger brother of fellow Argonaut Bryan Crawford.

In 2009 Crawford was invited to the Argonauts pre-season training camp, but was later put on the suspended list on June 7. He was invited to the Argonauts pre-season training camp again in 2010, but was released on June 20.

References

External links
Toronto Argonauts bio

1987 births
Living people
Canadian football defensive backs
Guelph Gryphons football players
Players of Canadian football from Ontario
Sportspeople from Hamilton, Ontario
Toronto Argonauts players